Ruatoki or Rūātoki is a district in the eastern Bay of Plenty of New Zealand, just south of the small town of Tāneatua and approximately 20 km south of the city of Whakatāne. The Whakatāne River runs northwards through the Ruatoki Valley and has formed broad alluvial flats. The main settlement of Ruatoki North is on the eastern side of the river.

The population of approximately 600 people are predominantly Māori of the Tūhoe iwi. The main economic activities in the Ruatoki Valley are dairy farming and cropping.

History
Tuhoe people started dairy farming at Ruatoki from at least the 1890s. The first school – Ruatoki Native School – and the first post office opened at the same site on the eastern side of the Whakatāne River in 1896. In 1908 two telegraph offices opened, one at the school and known as Ruatoki, and the other a little to the north at the store in the township and known as Ruatoki North.

A cheese factory opened in the township in 1908. The factory burned down in the late 1920s and a new concrete factory replaced it in 1928. The factory closed in 1964 and has since been demolished.

Ruatoki was one of the main sites involved in the 2007 New Zealand police raids, conducted under the Terrorism Suppression Act 2002.

Culture

Marae

There are ten marae, which are meeting places for local Tūhoe hapū.

 Ngāhina Marae and Tāwhaki meeting house is affiliated with Ngāti Tāwhaki.
 Ōhotu Marae and Tūhoe Pōtiki meeting house is affiliated with Te Whānau Pani.
 Ōtenuku Marae, Tahatu o Te Ao meeting house and Te Tapuwae cemetery is affiliated with Ngāti Kōura.
 Paneteure or Kaiti Marae and Hui te Rangiora meeting house is affiliated with Ngāti Rongo.
 Papakāinga Marae and Kōura-kino meeting house is affiliated with Ngāti Kōura.
 Rewarewa Marae, including Te Rangimoaho and Kuramihirangi meeting houses, is affiliated with Te Māhurehure.
 Tauarau Marae and Rongokarae meeting house is affiliated with Ngāti Rongo.
 Te Tōtara Marae and Te Puhi o Mātaatua meeting house is affiliated with Te Urewera.
 Waikirikiri Marae and Toi-kai-rakau meeting house is affiliated with Hāmua and Ngāti Mura.
 Ōwhakatoro Marae and Tā Apirana Turupa Ngata meeting house is affiliated with Ngāti Rongo.

In October 2020, the Government committed $263,775 from the Provincial Growth Fund to upgrade Ngāhina Marae, creating 12 jobs. It also contributed $622,833 to Ōtenuku, Paneteure and two other marae; $477,707 to Tauarau marae; and $1,646,820 to Waikirikiri and 5 other marae.

Education
Local Tuhoe leaders requested a school in 1891 and the Ruatoki Native School opened on the eastern side of the Whakatāne River on 4 June 1896. It became a district high school from 1946–47 until the secondary section closed in the 1970s. In 1978 it became New Zealand's first bilingual primary school. It then became a Māori language immersion school for children up to standard two, remaining bilingual for standards three and four. On 1 September 1992 it became an area school for children up to form seven and the first official kura kaupapa school. It is now Te Wharekura o Ruatoki, a co-educational state area school that teaches Year 1 to 13 students in the Māori language.

Children from west of the river attended Ruatoki Native School in the early decades. As there was no bridge, they waded the river, and missed school when the river was in flood. Consequently, Tawera Native School opened on the western side of the river on 29 July 1931. It is now Tawera Bilingual School, a co-educational state primary school for Year 1 to 8 students that teaches in Māori and English language.

Notable people 

 

Stacey Fluhler, rugby player
Tāme Iti (born 1952), Tūhoe activist and artist 
Kōhine Pōnika (1920–1990), Ngāti Porou and Tūhoe composer
Hikawera Te Kurapa (1907–1985), Tūhoe tribal tohunga, horse-breaker, farmer and ringatu leader
Te Ngahuru (died around 1823), Tūhoe leader and warrior
Arnold Manaaki Wilson (1928–2012), Tūhoe and Te Arawa artist and educator

References

Citations

Works cited
 

Whakatane District
Populated places in the Bay of Plenty Region